Kasseler may refer to:

 Kassler, a smoked and salted cut of pork in German cuisine
 A native of Kassel, Germany
 Johann Heinrich Tischbein, a German painter nicknamed "The Kasseler"